Parkersburg is an unincorporated community in Scott Township, Montgomery County, in the U.S. state of Indiana.

History
Parkersburg was platted by Thomas Arnett and Noble Welch in 1837. It was named for its first postmaster, Nathaniel Parker. A post office was established at Parkersburg in 1835, and remained in operation until it was discontinued in 1903.

Geography

References

Unincorporated communities in Montgomery County, Indiana
Unincorporated communities in Indiana